Ashton-Sandy Spring is a census-designated place (CDP) in Montgomery County, Maryland, United States. The CDP is designated to include the two unincorporated communities of Ashton and Sandy Spring. It had a population of 5,746 as of the 2020 census.

Geography
Ashton-Sandy Spring is located at  (39.148270, −76.998599).

Demographics

As of census 2010, there were 5,628 people, 1,839 households, and 1,434 families residing in the area. The racial makeup of the area was 71.7% White, 14.2% African American, 0.2% Native American, 8.3% Asian, 1.6% from other races, and 3.8% from two or more races. Hispanic or Latino of any race were 6.6% of the population.

There were 1,839 households, out of which 35.9% had children under the age of 18 living with them, 66.6% were married couples living together, 8.5% had a female householder with no husband present, and 22.0% were non-families. 19.1% of all households were made up of individuals living alone, and 12.3% had someone living alone who was 65 years of age or older. The average household size was 2.91 and the average family size was 3.34.

In the area the population was spread out, with 25.3% under the age of 18, 6.3% from 18 to 24, 16.7% from 25 to 44, 32.9% from 45 to 64, and 18.8% who were 65 years of age or older. The median age was 46 years. For every 100 females, there were 88.4 males. For every 100 females age 18 and over, there were 85.4 males.

A 2013 survey estimated that the median household income in the area was $119,432, and the median income for a family was $163,403. Males had an estimated median income of $86,250 versus $94,861 for females. The estimated per capita income for the area was $62,468. The survey estimated about 6.9% of families and 7.2% of the population were below the poverty line, including 9.1% of those under age 18 and 9.7% of those age 65 or over.

References

Census-designated places in Montgomery County, Maryland
Census-designated places in Maryland